The Campaign for Real Ale (CAMRA) is an independent voluntary consumer organisation headquartered in St Albans, England, which promotes real ale, cider and perry and traditional British pubs and clubs. With just over 150,000 members, it is the largest single-issue consumer group in the UK, and is a founding member of the European Beer Consumers Union (EBCU).

History

The organisation was founded on 16 March 1971 in Kruger's Bar, Dunquin, Kerry, Ireland, by Michael Hardman, Graham Lees, Jim Makin, and Bill Mellor, who were opposed to the growing mass production of beer and the homogenisation of the British brewing industry. The original name was the Campaign for the Revitalisation of Ale. Following the formation of the Campaign, the first annual general meeting took place in 1972, at the Rose Inn in Coton Road, Nuneaton. 

Early membership consisted of the four founders and their friends. Interest in CAMRA and its objectives spread rapidly, with 5,000 members signed up by 1973. Other early influential members included Christopher Hutt, author of Death of the English Pub, who succeeded Hardman as chairman, Frank Baillie, author of The Beer Drinker's Companion, and later the many times Good Beer Guide editor, Roger Protz.

In 1991, CAMRA reached 30,000 members across the UK and abroad and, a year later, helped to launch the European Beer Consumers Union. CAMRA remains EBCU's largest contributor, despite the UK's exit from the European Union.

CAMRA published a history book on its 50th birthday, 16 March 2021, written by Laura Hadland 50 Years of CAMRA.

Aims
CAMRA's stated aims are:
 To secure the long-term future of real ale, real cider and real perry by increasing their quality, availability and popularity
To promote and protect pubs and clubs as social centres as part of the UK's cultural heritage
To increase recognition of the benefits of responsible, moderate social drinking
To play a leading role in the provision of information, education and training to all those with an interest in beer, cider and perry of any type
To ensure, where possible, that producers and retailers of beer, cider and perry act in the best interests of the customer.

CAMRA's campaigns include promoting small brewing and pub businesses, reforming licensing laws, reducing tax on beer, and stopping continued consolidation among local British brewers. It also makes an effort to promote less common varieties of beer, including stout, porter, and mild, as well as traditional cider and perry.

CAMRA's states that real ale should be served without the use of additional carbonation. This means that "any beer brand which is produced in both cask and keg versions" is not admitted to CAMRA festivals if the brewery's marketing is deemed to imply an equivalence of quality or character between the two versions.

Organisation

CAMRA is organised on a federal basis, over 200 local branches, each covering a particular geographical area of the UK, that contribute to the central body of the organisation based in St Albans. It is governed by a National Executive, made up of 12 voluntary unpaid directors elected by the membership. The local branches are grouped into 16 regions across the UK, such as the West Midlands or Wessex.

In 2009, CAMRA's membership reached 100,000, and 150,000 members in 2013.

Publications and websites
CAMRA publishes the Good Beer Guide, an annually compiled directory of the best 4,500 real ale outlets and listing of real ale brewers.
CAMRA members received a monthly newspaper called What's Brewing until its April 2021 issue and there is a quarterly colour magazine called Beer. It also maintains a National Inventory of Historic Pub Interiors to help bring greater recognition and protection to Britain's most historic pubs.

Festivals

CAMRA supports and promotes beer and cider festivals around the country, which are organised by local CAMRA branches. Generally, each festival charges an entry fee which either covers entry only or also includes a commemorative glass showing the details of the festival. A festival programme is usually also provided, with a list and description of the drinks available. Members may get discounted entrance to CAMRA festivals.

The Campaign also organises the annual Great British Beer Festival in August. It is now held in the Great, National & West Halls at the Olympia Exhibition Centre, in Kensington, London, having been held for a few years at Earl's Court as well as regionally in the past at venues such as Brighton and Leeds. This is the UK's largest beer festival, with over 900 beers, ciders and perries available over the week long event.

For many years, CAMRA also organised the National Winter Ales Festival. However, in 2017 this was re-branded as the Great British Beer Festival Winter. Unlike the Great British Beer Festival, the Winter event does not have a permanent venue and is rotated throughout the country every three years. Recent hosts have been Derby and Norwich, with the event currently held each February in Birmingham. In 2020 CAMRA also launched the Great Welsh Beer Festival, to be held in Cardiff in April.

Awards
CAMRA presents awards for beers and pubs, such as the National Pub of the Year. The competition begins in the preceding year with branches choosing their local pub of the year through either a ballot or a panel of judges. The branch winners are entered into 16 regional competitions which are then visited by several individuals who agree the best using a scoring system that looks at beer quality, aesthetic, and welcome. The four finalists are announced each year before a ceremony to crown the winner in the spring. There are also the Pub Design Awards, which are held in association with English Heritage and the Victorian Society.  These comprise several categories, including new build, refurbished and converted pubs.

The best known CAMRA award is the Champion Beer of Britain, which is selected at the Great British Beer Festival. Other awards include the Champion Beer of Scotland and the Champion Beer of Wales.

National Beer Scoring Scheme
CAMRA developed the National Beer Scoring Scheme (NBSS) as an easy to use scheme for judging beer quality in pubs, to assist CAMRA branches in selecting pubs for the Good Beer Guide. CAMRA members input their beer scores online via WhatPub or through the Good Beer Guide app.

Pub heritage
The CAMRA Pub Heritage Group identifies, records and helps to protect pub interiors of historic and/or architectural importance, and seeks to get them listed.

The group maintains two inventories of Heritage pubs, the National Inventory (NI), which contains only those pubs that have been maintained in their original condition (or have been modified very little) for at least thirty years, but usually since at least World War II. The second, larger, inventory is the Regional Inventory (RI), which is broken down by county and contains both those pubs listed in the NI and other pubs that are not eligible for the NI, for reasons such as having been overly modified, but are still considered historically important, or have particular architectural value.

LocAle
The LocAle scheme was launched in 2007 to promote locally brewed beers. The scheme functions slightly differently in each area, and is managed by each branch, but each is similar: if the beer is to be promoted as a LocAle it must come from a brewery within a predetermined number of miles set by each CAMRA branch, generally around 20, although the North London branch has set it at 30 miles from brewery to pub, even if it comes from a distribution centre further away; in addition, each participating pub must keep at least one LocAle for sale at all times.

Investment club

CAMRA members may join the CAMRA Members' Investment Club which, since 1989, has invested in real ale breweries and pub chains. As of January 2021 the club had over 3,000 members and owned investments worth over £20 million. Although all investors must be CAMRA members, the CAMRA Members' Investment Club is not part of CAMRA Ltd.

See also

Society for the Preservation of Beers from the Wood
Society of Independent Brewers
Independent Family Brewers of Britain
European Beer Consumers' Union
Real Ale Twats

References

External links
CAMRA website

Pub Heritage Group – Official Site
Great British Beer Festival

1971 establishments in the United Kingdom
Beer in the United Kingdom
Beer organizations
British food and drink organisations
Consumer organisations in the United Kingdom
Organisations based in Hertfordshire
Organizations established in 1971